Abdoulaye Touré (born 3 March 1994) is a French professional footballer who plays as a defensive midfielder for Italian  club Genoa.

Early life
Touré was born in Nantes, France, to Guinean parents. They was from Touba, Boké Region.

Club career
Born Nantes, France, Touré made his Ligue 1 debut with hometown club FC Nantes on the opening game of the 2013–14 season on 11 August 2013 against SC Bastia. He replaced Yohann Eudeline after 62 minutes.

On 30 August 2021 Abdoulaye signed a 4-year contract with Genoa in Italy. He made his debut with "red & blue Grifoni" on 12 September 2021 in a victorious 3–2 match against Cagliari.

On 21 January 2022, he joined Fatih Karagümrük in Turkey on loan. He made his Süper Lig debut on the next day as a substitute in a 0–5 loss to Adana Demirspor.

International career
Touré is born in France and is of Guinean descent. He was a youth international for France. However, he pledged his international allegiance to Guinea in March 2018.

Career statistics

References

External links
 
 
 
 

1994 births
Living people
Footballers from Nantes
Association football forwards
French footballers
France youth international footballers
French sportspeople of Guinean descent
Black French sportspeople
Ligue 1 players
Ligue 2 players
Championnat National players
Championnat National 3 players
Serie A players
Serie B players
Süper Lig players
FC Nantes players
Vendée Poiré-sur-Vie Football players
Genoa C.F.C. players
Fatih Karagümrük S.K. footballers
French expatriate footballers
Expatriate footballers in Italy
French expatriate sportspeople in Italy
Expatriate footballers in Turkey
French expatriate sportspeople in Turkey